KGVM (95.9 FM) is a radio station licensed to serve the community of Bozeman, Montana. The station is owned by Gallatin Valley Community Radio and airs a community radio format.

The station was assigned the KGVM call letters by the Federal Communications Commission on June 19, 2015. The station's first on-air broadcast was on May 11, 2018.

The station operates from the basement of the Gallatin Labor Temple in Bozeman.

References

External links
 Official Website
 FCC Public Inspection File for KGVM
 

GVM
Radio stations established in 2018
2018 establishments in the United States
Community radio stations in the United States
Gallatin County, Montana